Martin Cimprich (born 5 March 1999) is a Czech rugby union player. His usual positions are Flyhalf or Fullback, and he currently plays for HAC RUFC in Regional 2 Anglia in England. He has been capped 12 times for the Czech Republic and won their Player of the Year Award in 2019.

Career 
Martin Cimprich spent the majority of his youth at RC Mountfeild Říčany playing in the top flight of Czech Rugby before moving to the United Kingdom for University, and signing for Scottish side Musselburgh RFC. After a season he moved to Super 6 side Borougmuir Bears.

International career
Martin was first picked for the Czech u18 Age Grade side in 2014, When he was only 15. By the time he reached 17 he was called up to the main National Team where he featured off the bench in a friendly versus the RSA Barbarians where he scored on debut. His first cap was on the 28th October 2017 in the 19–14 victory over Poland. Since then he has won 12 caps, the most recent being in the 2022/23 Rugby Europe Conference 1 North against Moldova. 

In 2019 he made a single appearance for Scotland Students starting at fullback in their 31-3 defeat against Ireland Students.

Honours

Personal 
2014 Czech u16 Player of the Year
2015 Czech u18 Player of the Year
2016 Czech u18 Player of the Year
2017 Czech u20 Player of the Year
2019 Czech Player of the Year (Youngest ever to win the award)

References

1999 births
Living people
Sportspeople from Prague
Boroughmuir RFC players